Jalan Bekoh (Malacca state route M123 or Johor state route M123) is a major road in Malacca and Johor state, Malaysia.

List of junctions

References

Roads in Malacca
Roads in Johor